The "lesbian kiss episode" is a subgenre of the media portrayal of lesbianism in American television media, created in the 1990s. Beginning in February 1991 with a kiss on the American L.A. Law series' episode "He's a Crowd" between C.J. Lamb and Abby Perkins, David E. Kelley, who wrote the episode in question, went on to use the trope in at least two of his other shows. Subsequent television series included an episode in which a seemingly heterosexual female character engages in a kiss with a possibly lesbian or bisexual character. In most instances, the potential of a relationship between the women does not survive past the episode and the lesbian or suspected lesbian never appears again.

In 2005, Virginia Heffernan, writing for The New York Times, examined the lesbian kiss episode phenomenon.  She concluded that women kissing women is often used as a gimmick during "sweeps" periods, times when Nielsen ratings are used by the broadcast networks to determine advertising rates. Lesbian kisses are:

Eminently visual; cheap, provided the actors are willing; controversial, year in and year out; and elegantly reversible (sweeps lesbians typically vanish or go straight when the week's over), kisses between women are perfect sweeps stunts. They offer something for everyone, from advocacy groups looking for role models to indignation-seeking conservatives, from goggle-eyed male viewers to progressive female ones, from tyrants who demand psychological complexity to plot buffs.

Michele Greene, who played Abby on L.A. Law, confirmed in an interview with AfterEllen.com that her kiss with Amanda Donohoe's C.J. was a ratings ploy and that there was never any intention on the part of producers to seriously explore the possibility of a relationship between two women. The attitude about portraying lesbian relationships with any longevity persisted in Hollywood, as Buffy the Vampire Slayer (1997–2003) writer Marti Noxon encountered resistance from television executives when setting the groundwork for the long-term relationship between Willow Rosenberg (Alyson Hannigan) and Tara Maclay (Amber Benson). Noxon spoke of the resistance Buffy writers encountered in 2002, saying in an interview, "You can show girls kissing once, but you can't show them kissing twice… because the second time, it means that they liked it."

Examples

See also 
 Bury your gays
 Queerbaiting

Explanatory notes

References

Citations

General bibliography 
 

1990s beginnings
Kissing
Lesbian-related television
LGBT-related television episodes